Hlybokaye District is a district in Vitebsk Region, Belarus. The administrative center of the district is the town of Hlybokaye.

Notable residents 
 Ihnat Bujnicki (1881, Palivačy estate - 1917), Belarusian actor and theatre director, described as “the father of the Belarusian theatre”
Jazep Drazdovič (1888, Puńki village –1954), Belarusian painter, archaeologist, and ethnographer
 Vaclau Lastouski (1883, Kalesniki hamlet – 1938), Belarusian critic, historian of literature, and politician, victim of Stalin’s purges

References

Districts of Vitebsk Region